Mount Edith Cavell is a mountain located in the Athabasca River and Astoria River valleys of Jasper National Park, and the most prominent peak entirely within Alberta.

The mountain was named in 1916 for Edith Cavell, a British nurse executed by the Germans during World War I for having helped Allied soldiers escape from occupied Belgium to the Netherlands, in violation of German military law. It was previously known as Mount Fitzhugh.

A close-up view of the north face of Mount Edith Cavell is visible after a short hike to Cavell Meadows. The trailhead is by the parking lot at the end of Mount Edith Cavell Road. The Canadian Rockies Trail Guide describes the trail in detail.

The hanging Angel Glacier is visible from Cavell Meadows, which spills over a  cliff on the north face.

Access to the Tonquin Valley trails can be found about one kilometre before the end of the Mount Edith Cavell Road.  There is a parking area across from the Mount Edith Cavell Hostel.  A short walk down the gravel path leads to the north end of Cavell Lake. There is small bridge across the stream that empties the lake.  From here there are good views with the lake in the foreground and the Mount Edith Cavell massif in the background.

It is believed that one of the world's largest glacial erratics, called Big Rock, located near Okotoks, Alberta, was once part of Mount Edith Cavell. The erratic was formed approximately ten thousand years ago when a large portion of quartzite stone was stripped away from the mountain along with the receding Athabasca River Valley glacier.

Climbing routes 
There are several popular climbing routes, including:
 West Ridge (normal route): Yosemite Decimal System II
 East Ridge: Yosemite Decimal System III, 5.3
 North Face, East Summit: Yosemite Decimal System IV, 5.8

The North Face route is included as a classic climb in Steck and Roper's Fifty Classic Climbs of North America.

Notable ascents
 1961 North Face, IV 5.7, First ascent by Yvon Chouinard, Fred Beckey and Dan Doody. July 20–21.
 1966 North Face, Second ascent by Denny Eberl and Gray Thompson. July 30, 1966.
 1967 North Face, First solo ascent by Royal Robbins.

In Philately

Mount Edith Cavell was featured on a $1 Canadian stamp issued on December 4, 1930.

Climate

Based on the Köppen climate classification, the mountain is located in a subarctic climate zone with cold, snowy winters, and mild summers. Temperatures can drop below -20 °C with wind chill factors below -30 °C. Precipitation runoff from the mountain drains into tributaries of the Athabasca River.

See also 
 List of mountains of Alberta
 Mountain peaks of Canada
 Mountain peaks of North America
 Mountain peaks of the Rocky Mountains
 Rocky Mountains

References

External links 

 Angel Glacier photos on Wikimedia Commons
 HI-Mount Edith Cavell Hostel

Mountains of Jasper National Park
Three-thousanders of Alberta